Sikandra may refer to:

Sikandra, a suburb of Agra, the location of Akbar's tomb
Sikandara, a town in Kanpur Dehat district in the Indian state of Uttar Pradesh.
Sikandra (Vidhan Sabha constituency), a constituency of Uttar Pradesh Legislative assembly
Sikandara, a tehsil or sub division in Kanpur Dehat district of Uttar Pradesh